Salak Deh (also Romanized as Sālak Deh, Sālek Deh, and Salkadeh) is a village in Kiashahr Rural District, Kiashahr District, Astaneh-ye Ashrafiyeh County, Gilan Province, Iran. In 2006, its population was 1,058, in 334 families.

References 

Populated places in Astaneh-ye Ashrafiyeh County